Recollection is a live album by Strawbs. The tracks were recorded in 1970 on a tour supporting Roy Harper just prior to the concert at the Queen Elizabeth Hall (the recordings from this concert were released as the album Just a Collection of Antiques and Curios).

This incarnation of the band had only rehearsed together for a couple of weeks. The recording is the first made with Rick Wakeman, John Ford and Richard Hudson in the line-up and features live re-workings of songs from the Strawbs and Dragonfly albums as well as alternative recordings of some of the Antiques and Curios songs.

Track listing
All tracks written by Dave Cousins unless indicated otherwise

"We'll Meet Again Sometime" – 4:12
"Or Am I Dreaming" – 2:29
"Song of a Sad Little Girl" – 5:29
"That Which Once was Mine" – 3:33
"Fingertips" –6:10
"The Man Who Called Himself Jesus" – 4:35
"Temperament of Mind" (Rick Wakeman) – 5:28
"Josephine, for Better or for Worse" – 3:27
"The Antique Suite" – 12:15
"The Reaper"
"We Must Cross the River"
"Antiques and Curios"
"Hey It's Been a Long Time"
"The Battle" – 5:52
"Where is This Dream of Your Youth?" – 9:31
"Dance On" (Valerie Murtagh, Elaine Murtagh, Ray Adams) – 2:22

Personnel
Dave Cousins – vocals, guitars, dulcimer, banjo
Tony Hooper – vocals, acoustic guitar, tambourine
Rick Wakeman – piano, organ, harpsichord, celesta
John Ford – bass guitar, vocals
Richard Hudson – percussion, sitar, vocals

Recording

Recorded live 1970
Mixed by Roger Wake
Produced by Dave Cousins

Cover
The photographs used were taken by Van Hallan (1970) from Dave Cousins' own collection and Geraldine Parkinson (2006). Sleeve notes by Dave Cousins.

Release history

References

Recollection on Strawbs website
Insert from CD WMCD 2033 Recollection

2006 live albums
Strawbs live albums